Dhansa is a village in Jaswantpura Tehsil of Jalore district of Rajasthan state in India. Dhansa is a large village with total 1534 families residing. The Dhansa village has a population of 7819, of which 3797 are males and 4022 are females as per Population Census 2011. It is one of the rare villages with a better female to male ratio. The nearest railway station in Modran, Rajasthan on Samdari- Bhildi rail route.

Villages in Jalore district